Wyoming Highway 33 is a  Wyoming state highway located in Big Horn County southwest of Lovell.

Route description
Wyoming Highway 33 is a spur route from Wyoming 32 southwest of Lovell south to Forester Gulch. WYO 33 is only 1.39 miles in length and becomes a Bureau of Land Management maintained route where the state highway designation ends. Mileposts along WYO 33 increase from north to south.

Major intersections

References

 Official 2003 State Highway Map of Wyoming

External links 

 Wyoming State Routes 000-099
 WYO 33 - WYO 32 to Big Horn CR 9½

Transportation in Big Horn County, Wyoming
033